Dye-decolorizing peroxidase (DyP, DyP-type peroxidase) is an enzyme with systematic name Reactive-Blue-5:hydrogen-peroxide oxidoreductase. This enzyme catalyses the following chemical reaction

 Reactive Blue 5 + H2O2  phthalate + 2,2'-disulfonyl azobenzene + 3-[(4-amino-6-chloro-1,3,5-triazin-2-yl)amino]benzenesulfonate

These heme proteins are secreted by basidiomycetous fungi and eubacteria.

References

External links 
 

EC 1.11.1